Flushing is to become markedly red in the face and often other areas of the skin, from various physiological conditions. Flushing is generally distinguished  from blushing, since blushing is psychological, milder, generally restricted to the face, cheeks or ears, and generally assumed to reflect emotional stress, such as embarrassment, anger, or romantic stimulation. Flushing is also a cardinal symptom of carcinoid syndrome—the syndrome that results from hormones (often serotonin or histamine) being secreted into systemic circulation.

Causes

 abrupt cessation of physical exertion (resulting in heart output in excess of current muscular need for blood flow)
 abdominal cutaneous nerve entrapment syndrome (ACNES), usually in patients who have had abdominal surgery  
 alcohol flush reaction
 antiestrogens such as tamoxifen
 atropine poisoning
 body contact with warm or hot water (hot tub, bath, shower)
 butorphanol reaction with some narcotic analgesics (since butorphanol is also an antagonist)
 caffeine consumption
 carbon monoxide poisoning
 carcinoid tumor
 chronic obstructive pulmonary disease (COPD), especially emphysema (also known as "pink puffer")
 cluster headache attack or headache
 compression of the nerve by the sixth thoracic vertebrae
 coughing, particularly severe coughing fits
 Cushing's syndrome
 dehydration
 dysautonomia
 emotions: anger, embarrassment (for this reason it is also called erythema pudoris, from the Latinized Greek word for "redness" and the Latin "of embarrassment")
 fever
 fibromyalgia
 histamines
 homocystinuria (flushing across the cheeks)
 Horner's syndrome
 hot flush
 hyperglycaemia
 hyperstimulation of the parasympathetic nervous system, especially the vagus nerve
 hyperthyroidism
 inflammation (for example, caused by allergic reaction or infection)
 iron poisoning
 Jarisch-Herxheimer reaction (caused by antibiotics)
 keratosis pilaris rubra faceii
 Kratom
 mastocytosis
 medullary thyroid cancer
 mixing an antibiotic with alcohol
 neuroendocrine tumors
 niacin (vitamin B3)
 pheochromocytoma 
 polycythemia vera
 powerful vasodilators, such as dihydropyridine calcium channel blockers
 severe pain
 sexual arousal, especially orgasm (see following section)
 sexual intercourse (see below)
 sneezing (red nose)
 some recreational drugs, such as alcohol, heroin, cocaine and amphetamines
 spicy foods
 sunburn (erythema)
 tachycardia
 vinpocetine

Sex flush
Commonly referred to as the sex flush, vasocongestion (increased blood flow) of the skin can occur during all four phases of the human sexual response cycle. Studies show that the sex flush occurs in approximately 50–75% of females and 25% of males, yet not consistently. The sex flush tends to occur more often under warmer conditions and may not appear at all under lower temperatures.

During the female sex flush, pinkish spots develop under the breasts, then spread to the breasts, torso, face, hands, soles of the feet, and possibly over the entire body. Vasocongestion is also responsible for the darkening of the clitoris and the walls of the vagina during sexual arousal. During the male sex flush, the coloration of the skin develops less consistently than in the female, but typically starts with the epigastrium (upper abdomen), spreads across the chest, then continues to the neck, face, forehead, back, and sometimes, shoulders and forearms.

The sex flush typically disappears soon after reaching orgasm, but in other cases, may take up to two hours or more, and sometimes intense sweating occurs simultaneously.

See also
 Cholinergic urticaria
 Erythema
 Pallor
 Rash

References

Sexual arousal
Symptoms and signs: Skin and subcutaneous tissue